Luigi Belloli  (25 July 1923 – 5 November 2011) was an Italian Prelate of the Catholic Church.

Luigi Belloli was born in Inveruno, Italy, ordained a priest by Cardinal Alfredo Ildefonso Schuster on 15 June 1946. Belloli was appointed bishop of the Diocese of Anagni-Alatri on 7 December 1987 and ordained on 6 January 1988. Belloli would retire from Anagni-Alatri on 6 March 1999.

Belloli died in his hometown of Inveruno on 5 November 2011.

See also
Diocese of Anagni-Alatri

References

External links
Catholic-Hierarchy 
Anagni-Alatri Diocese

1923 births
2011 deaths
20th-century Italian Roman Catholic bishops